Bram is a railway station in Bram, Occitanie, France. The station is on the Bordeaux–Sète railway line. The station is served by TER (local) services operated by the SNCF.

Train services
The following services currently call at Bram:
local service (TER Occitanie) Toulouse–Carcassonne–Narbonne

References

Railway stations in Aude
Railway stations in France opened in 1857